David Garel Rhys  (28 February 1940 – 21 February 2017) was a Welsh academic and a commentator of long standing on Motor Industry matters in Britain, who was Professor of Motor Industry Economics, and Director for Automotive Industry Research at Cardiff Business School.

Early life
David attended Ystalyfera Grammar School at Ystalyfera, then in West Glamorgan, now in Neath Port Talbot. He studied at University College, Swansea, then the University of Birmingham.

Career
From 1984 to 2005 he was Professor of Motor Industry Economics at Cardiff University.

Personal life
He married in 1965 to Charlotte Mavis Walters. The couple have one son and two daughters, and four grandchildren including Evan. He was the second cousin of Rhodri Morgan, the former First Minister of Wales.

He was invested as an Officer of the Order of the British Empire in 1989, and as a Commander of the Order of the British Empire in 2007 for services to economic research in Wales. He was a Liveryman of the Worshipful Company of Carmen, and was granted the Freedom of the City of London in 2000.

Publications
 The Motor Industry: An Economic Survey (1971)
 The Motor Industry in the European Community (1989)
 Outsourcing and Human Resource Management (contributor, 2008)

See also
 Prof Peter Wells, Professor of Business and Sustainability at Cardiff Business School
 Welsh Automotive Forum

References

1940 births
2017 deaths
Academics of Cardiff Business School
Alumni of Swansea University
Alumni of the University of Birmingham
Automotive industry in the United Kingdom
Commanders of the Order of the British Empire
People from Neath Port Talbot
Welsh scholars and academics